Victor Ehikhamenor is a Nigerian visual artist, writer, and photographer known for his expansive works that engage with multinational cultural heritage and postcolonial socioeconomics of contemporary black lives. In 2017, he was selected (along with two other artists) to represent Nigeria at the Venice Biennale, the first time Nigeria would be represented in the event. His work has been described as representing "a symbol of resistance" to colonialism.

Early life and education
Ehikhamenor was born in Udomi-Uwessan, Edo State, Nigeria, part of the ancient Benin Kingdom, known for its historical bronze=casting tradition. He was educated in Nigeria and in the United States. He returned from the United States in 2008 to work in Lagos.

His grandmother was a cloth weaver, his uncle a photographer, his maternal grandfather a blacksmith, and his mother a local artist.

Art and writing 
His work is strongly influenced by work done by villagers especially his grandmother. He credits this traditional upbringing as the foundational tenet of his inspiration; from grandmothers weaving cloth with locally dyed thread in her min-loom to observing his mother's meticulous painting/decorating with homemade clay and charcoal pigments, to watching other villagers mark-making on ancient shrine walls and altars. This has been an enduring feature of his work, which is abstract, symbolic and politically motivated; and influenced by the duality of African traditional religion and the interception of Western beliefs, memories and nostalgia.

Ehikhamenor has held numerous solo art exhibitions across the world. In 2016, he was one of 11 Nigerian artists invited to join twenty-three Indonesian artists in the grand exhibition at the Biennale. At the Jogja National Museum, he showed an installation titled "The Wealth of Nations." Ehikhamenor was invited to Art Dubai in March 2018. In July 2018, he was also one of the Nigerian artists selected to meet and exhibit work for visiting French President Emmanuel Macron. The exhibition, organised by ART X Lagos took place at the Afrika Shrine, the nightclub of Femi Kuti. His work has also been shown in solo and group exhibitions at museums and galleries across the world, including Tyburn Gallery (London), Rele Gallery (Lagos, Nigeria), Jennings Gallery (Washington, DC), the 5th Meditationa Biennale (Poznan, Poland), the 12th Dak'art Biennale (Dakar, Senegal), Biennale Jogja XIII (Yogyakarta, Indonesia).

Ehikhamenor's art and photographs have been used for editorials as well as cover art on books by authors such as Chimamanda Adichie, Helon Habila, Toni Kan, Chude Jideonwo, and Chika Unigwe. They have also been illustrated on fabric and exhibited at international fashion parades.

His debut poetry collection, Sordid Rituals, was published in 2002. His second book, Excuse Me! (2012), a satirical creative non-fiction view of life as an African both at home and abroad, is a recommended text in two Nigerian universities.

He has published numerous fiction and critical essays with academic journals, mainstream magazines and newspapers from around the world including The New York Times, CNN Online, Washington Post, Farafina, AGNI Magazine and Wasafiri. His short story, "The Supreme Command", won the Association of Commonwealth Broadcasters Award in 2003.

He was once described as "undeniably one of Africa's most innovative contemporary artists" and one of "42 African Innovators to Watch".

Comments on Damien Hirst piece 

On May 8, 2017, while participating in the Venice Biennale, Ehikhamenor first called attention to what he describes as Damien Hirst cultural appropriation of Nigerian Yoruba art. The exhibition of the British artist, called Treasures From the Wreck of the Unbelievable, featured a variety of sculptures meant to be viewed as debris rescued from a shipwreck. But one of the displayed artefacts was a copy of "Ori Olokun", a famous Ife bronze art from the 14th century now described as "Golden heads".

Of the appropriation, Ehikhamenor had posted on Instagram "For the thousands of viewers seeing this for the first time, they won't think Ife, they won't think Nigeria. Their young ones will grow up to know this work as Damien Hirst's. As time passes it will pass for a Damien Hirst regardless of his small print caption. The narrative will shift and the young Ife or Nigerian contemporary artist will someday be told by a long nose critic "Your work reminds me of Damien Hirst's Golden Head. We need more biographers for our forgotten."

His words brought the issue to the forefront on local and international media.

 Angels and Muse 
In February 2018, Ehikhamenor opened Angels and Muse, described as "a multi-modal co-working space in Lagos draped with wall murals, stained glasses, and beautiful lighting, making for a stunning visual and immersive experience."  The space, also used for artist residencies, is located in the Ikoyi area of Lagos state and contains a ‘multidisciplinary room,' used for "workshop, training, book reading, experimental or conceptual art exhibitions, among other usages." The project was featured on the 10th episode of the Netflix series Amazing Interiors in July 2018.

Book cover designs
2003: Feeding Frenzy by Jonathan Luckett
2004: Purple Hibiscus by Chimamanda Adichie
2005: Sky High Flame by Unoma Azuah
2005: English In Africa Journal of the English Department, Rhodes University, South Africa
2007: Measuring Times by Helon Habila
2008: Jambula Tree and Other Stories Anthology of Caine Prize winners and shortlisted writer by Cassava Republic, Abuja Nigeria
2008: Dreams, Miracles and Jazz by Helon Habila and Khadija Sesay
2008: One World Anthology of short stories by  New Internationalist Publishers, UK
2008: Of Friends, Money and Greed Anthology of three stories and a play by Hodders Publishers, UK
2009: Songs of Absence and Despair collection of poems by Toni Kan
2009: Salutes without Guns collection of poems by Ikeogu Oke
2010: Christopher Okigbo: Thirsting for Sunlight by Obi Nwakanma
2010: Shahid Reads His Own Palm Poems by Reginald Dwayne Betts
2011: Markets of Memories; Between the Postcolonial and the Transnational by Malik Nwosu
2012: A Splash of Glory by Angela Nwosu
2013: Oil on Water by Helon Habila
2014: Africa in Fragments: Essays on Nigeria, Africa and Africanity by Moses Ochonu
2014: Half of a Yellow Sun- (Movie Edition) by Chimamanda Adichie
2014: Americanah by Chimamanda Ngozi Adichie
2015: Literature and Arts in the African Dispora
2015: Story Collection for Caine Prize for African Writing 2015
2016: New Generation African poets: A chapbook box set (TATU); edited by Kwame Dawes and Chris Abani
2016: The Sound of Things to Come by Emmanuel Iduma
2017: Under the Udala Trees by Chinelo Okparanta (English and French Version)
2018: Reshapig Cultural Policies: Advancing Creativity for Development 2018 UNESCO
2018: The Rape of Shavi by Buchi Emecheta
2018: The Bride Price by Buchi Emecheta
2018: Double Yoke by Buchi Emecheta
2018: In the Ditch by Buchi Emecheta
2018: Head above Water by Buchi Emecheta
2018: The Slave Girl by Buchi Emecheta

Awards and residencies
2015: Casa Zia Lina, Elba Italy
2016: Nirox Foundation Residency, Johannesburg, South Africa
2016: Greatmore Residency, Cape Town, South Africa
2016: Rockefeller Foundation Bellagio Fellow, Italy
2018: Civitella Ranieri Fellow, Italy
2018: Art Dubai Residency
2020: National Artist in Residence, Neon Museum, Las Vegas

Exhibitions

Solo exhibitions
2000: Spirits In Dialogue The Brazilian-American Cultural Institute Gallery, Washington, D.C.
2000: Beyond The Surface Utopia Art/Grill, Washington, D.C.
2001: Discovering the gods Monroe Gallery, Arts Club of Washington, Washington, D.C.
2004: Songs and Stories: Moonlight Delight Utopia Gallery, Washington, D.C.
2005: Talking Walls BB&T Bank, NW Washington, D.C.
2005: Divine Intervention Howard University A J Blackburn Center Gallery, Washington, D.C.
2005: Body Language Utopia Art/Grill, Washington, D.C.
2006: Beyond The River Grenada Embassy, Washington, D.C.
2007: Labyrinth of Memories Didi Museum, Lagos, Nigeria.
2007: Rocks & Roses Victoria Crown Plaza, Lagos, Nigeria.
2008: Invasion of Privacy Jennings Gallery, Washington, D.C
2009: Mirrors and Mirages Terra Kulture Gallery, Lagos, Nigeria
2010: Roforofo Fight: Painting to Fela's Music Bloom Gallery, Lagos  Nigeria
2011: Artist Experience Whitespace, Ikoyi Lagos
2011: Entrances & Exits: In search of not forgetting, CCA, Lagos Nigeria2012: "Crossing the Line" Bloom Gallery, Lagos
2013: Amusing The Muse Temple Muse, Lagos
2014: In The Lion's Lair: Photographing Wole Soyinka Ake Arts and Books Festival, Abeokuta, Nigeria.
2014: Chronicles Of The Enchanted World Gallery of African Art, London
2015: Paperwork: Works on paper Constant Capital Gallery, Lagos
2016 1:54 Contemporary African Art Fair
2017 In the Kingdom of this World, Tyburn Gallery, London
2019: Daydream Esoterica Rele Gallery, Lagos
2021: "Facebook HQ Open Art" in Dubai UAE.
2021: “Do This In Memory of Us” Lehman Maupin gallery, New York
2021: The Royal Academy Summer Show curated by Yinka Shonibare
2022: "Still Standing" at St. Paul's Cathedral, London, England.

Group exhibitions
2008: Black Creativity Museum of Science and Industry, Chicago, IL, USA
2014: ARENA Center of Contemporary Art, Torun, Poland
2015: Displacement Fiction and drawings in collaboration with Toby Zielony for German Pavilion, 56th Venice Biennale, Italy
2015: Biennale Jogja XIII, Equator #3 2015, Indonesia
2016: A Place In Time Nirox Foundation Sculpture Park in collaboration with Yorkshire Sculpture Park, Johannesburg, South Africa
2016: Dakart Biennale Curated by Simon Njami
2017 A Biography of the Forgotten, Nigerian Pavilion, 57th Venice Biennale, Venice, Italy with Peju Alatise and Qudus Onikeku
2018: 2018 ReSignifications: The Black Mediterranean
2018: International Contemporary Art Exhibition; Armenia
2020: Tomorrow there will be more of us'', Stellenbosch Triennale, Stellenbosch, South Africa
2021: "Looted History" MUSEUM AM ROTHENBAUM, Hamburg Germany.

References

External links

The Art of Victor Ehikhamenor Essay by Emmanuel Iduma
Nigerian artist Victor Ehikhamenor's canvas sculptures Feature on the BBC
Victor Ehikhamenor: Confronting an Empty Canvas. Interview with Sola Osofisan

Living people
University of Maryland, College Park alumni
Nigerian writers
Nigerian photographers
Year of birth missing (living people)